Bartlett Springs is a set of springs around which a resort was developed in Lake County, California.
There were four improved springs, each delivering cool carbonated water with considerable amounts of suspended iron.
In 1914 it was the largest such resort in Lake County, capable of accommodating up to 500 guests.
There was also a bottling plant designed to maintain the natural carbonation as the bottles were filled and capped.
It could fill 10,000 per day during the season from May to October when the roads were passable.

Location

It is near the head of Bartlett Creek, a tributary of Cache Creek.
The springs are mostly on the slopes some distance above the resort.
The rocks around the springs are altered sandstone, shale and serpentine.

Springs

The Main Spring or Bartlett Spring is in the northern part of site at the foot of the steep slope.
As of 1911 it was surrounded by a cement floor and its water was fed up into a tin-lined cement basin that was used as a drinking fountain.
Pipes carried water from the spring to a small fountain at the hotel and to the bottling building.

As of 1911 it was in a small springhouse.
Its water was used for drinking and also piped to a swimming plunge.

It also deposits considerable amounts of suspended iron.
It is alkaline, with more magnesium than Main Spring.

The Gas Spring is about  along a trail northeast of the Main Spring over a divide into the basin of the North Fork of Cache Creek.
There is only a small overflow seeping from the pool in summer, but the water is constantly turbulent due to large bubbles of carbon dioxide.

Resort

Barlett Springs were discovered by Green Bartlett when he was on a camping trip in 1869.
He was suffering from rheumatism and found that the waters helped him. 
He acquired the property and established a resort.
Bartlett's resort could accommodate 500 guests.
A post office operated at Bartlett Springs from 1873 to 1935.
As of 1914 it was the largest resort in Lake County with the most accommodations.
The resort had a resident physician during the season from mid-May to October 
Beside the main hotel there were large numbers of cottages and several other buildings including a general merchandise store, drugstore, bakery and butcher's shop.

Bottling plant

The bottling works were below the hotel and the spring, so received a good hydraulic head.
The water was taken from the bottom of the spring through a tin pipe to prevent the natural gas from escaping from the water.
The water ran through a Berkefeld filter, then the bottles were filled by a tube that ran to the bottom of the bottle. 
As soon as each bottle was filled it was hermetically closed with a clamped cap.
Each bottle was checked to make sure it was properly filled and free of organic matter before being packed for transport.
A gasoline engine provided power for machines at the bottling plant including a bottle washer, labeling machine and conveyor belt.
15 men worked at the plant, which could produce 10,000 bottles during a 9-hour day.
The plant only operated in Summer and Fall, when the roads were in good condition, since there were no storage facilities.
Between May and October there were about ten mule teams, each with 8-12 mules, hauling the cases of bottles to the railroad at Williams.

References

Sources 

 

Springs of Lake County, California
Resorts in Lake County, California